The 8th constituency of the Bas-Rhin is a French legislative constituency in the Bas-Rhin département.

Description

The 8th constituency of Bas-Rhin covers the Northernmost portion of the Departement, bordering  (Germany) to both the east and north. It includes the small town of Wissembourg on the German border as well as the surrounding countryside.

It was a bastion of the conservative right from the inception of the Fifth Republic until 2022. It was won easily by the UMP in the first round of the 2012 election, with the National Front coming a distant second some 16,000 votes behind Frédéric Reiss.  In the 2017 election, he easily beat the LREM candidate. However, in 2022, LR lost the seat to Horizons, part of Emmanuel Macron's centrist Ensemble Citoyens alliance.

Historic representation

Election results

2022

 
 
|-
| colspan="8" bgcolor="#E9E9E9"|
|-

2017

|- style="background-color:#E9E9E9;text-align:center;"
! colspan="2" rowspan="2" style="text-align:left;" | Candidate
! rowspan="2" colspan="2" style="text-align:left;" | Party
! colspan="2" | 1st round
! colspan="2" | 2nd round
|- style="background-color:#E9E9E9;text-align:center;"
! width="75" | Votes
! width="30" | %
! width="75" | Votes
! width="30" | %
|-
| style="background-color:" |
| style="text-align:left;" | Christian Gliech
| style="text-align:left;" | La République En Marche!
| LREM
| 
| 32.98
| 
| 41.12
|-
| style="background-color:" |
| style="text-align:left;" | Frédéric Reiss
| style="text-align:left;" | The Republicans
| LR
| 
| 30.20
| 
| 58.88
|-
| style="background-color:" |
| style="text-align:left;" | Gérard Janus
| style="text-align:left;" | National Front
| FN
| 
| 17.17
| colspan="2" style="text-align:left;" |
|-
| style="background-color:" |
| style="text-align:left;" | Gaby Hartmann
| style="text-align:left;" | Regionalist
| REG
| 
| 7.74
| colspan="2" style="text-align:left;" |
|-
| style="background-color:" |
| style="text-align:left;" | Manuel Menetrier
| style="text-align:left;" | La France Insoumise
| FI
| 
| 4.75
| colspan="2" style="text-align:left;" |
|-
| style="background-color:" |
| style="text-align:left;" | Pierre-Henri Eisenschmidt
| style="text-align:left;" | Debout la France
| DLF
| 
| 2.32
| colspan="2" style="text-align:left;" |
|-
| style="background-color:" |
| style="text-align:left;" | Perrine Torrent
| style="text-align:left;" | Ecologist
| ECO
| 
| 1.78
| colspan="2" style="text-align:left;" |
|-
| style="background-color:" |
| style="text-align:left;" | Ambroise Perrin
| style="text-align:left;" | Socialist Party
| PS
| 
| 1.21
| colspan="2" style="text-align:left;" |
|-
| style="background-color:" |
| style="text-align:left;" | Daniel Fischer
| style="text-align:left;" | Independent
| DIV
| 
| 0.53
| colspan="2" style="text-align:left;" |
|-
| style="background-color:" |
| style="text-align:left;" | Gisèle Schneider
| style="text-align:left;" | Ecologist
| ECO
| 
| 0.50
| colspan="2" style="text-align:left;" |
|-
| style="background-color:" |
| style="text-align:left;" | Pascal Prevost-Boure
| style="text-align:left;" | Communist Party
| PCF
| 
| 0.42
| colspan="2" style="text-align:left;" |
|-
| style="background-color:" |
| style="text-align:left;" | Mehdi Benhlal
| style="text-align:left;" | Far Left
| EXG
| 
| 0.39
| colspan="2" style="text-align:left;" |
|-
| colspan="8" style="background-color:#E9E9E9;"|
|- style="font-weight:bold"
| colspan="4" style="text-align:left;" | Total
| 
| 100%
| 
| 100%
|-
| colspan="8" style="background-color:#E9E9E9;"|
|-
| colspan="4" style="text-align:left;" | Registered voters
| 
| style="background-color:#E9E9E9;"|
| 
| style="background-color:#E9E9E9;"|
|-
| colspan="4" style="text-align:left;" | Blank/Void ballots
| 
| 2.26%
| 
| 6.65%
|-
| colspan="4" style="text-align:left;" | Turnout
| 
| 46.39%
| 
| 42.48%
|-
| colspan="4" style="text-align:left;" | Abstentions
| 
| 53.61%
| 
| 57.52%
|-
| colspan="8" style="background-color:#E9E9E9;"|
|- style="font-weight:bold"
| colspan="6" style="text-align:left;" | Result
| colspan="2" style="background-color:" | LR GAIN FROM UMP
|}

2012
Frédéric Reiss was elected with more than 50% of the vote in the first round of voting, and therefore no second round took place.

|- style="background-color:#E9E9E9;text-align:center;"
! colspan="2" rowspan="2" style="text-align:left;" | Candidate
! rowspan="2" colspan="2" style="text-align:left;" | Party
! colspan="2" | 1st round
|- style="background-color:#E9E9E9;text-align:center;"
! width="75" | Votes
! width="30" | %
|-
| style="background-color:" |
| style="text-align:left;" | Frédéric Reiss
| style="text-align:left;" | Union for a Popular Movement
| UMP
| 
| 53.64
|-
| style="background-color:" |
| style="text-align:left;" | Diana Garnier-Lang
| style="text-align:left;" | National Front
| FN
| 
| 20.54
|-
| style="background-color:" |
| style="text-align:left;" | Nicole Habermacher
| style="text-align:left;" | Socialist Party
| PS
| 
| 17.59
|-
| style="background-color:" |
| style="text-align:left;" | Alphonse Sibler
| style="text-align:left;" | Ecologist
| ECO
| 
| 1.92
|-
| style="background-color:" |
| style="text-align:left;" | Séverine Charret
| style="text-align:left;" | Left Front
| FG
| 
| 1.77
|-
| style="background-color:" |
| style="text-align:left;" | Perrine Torrent
| style="text-align:left;" | Ecologist
| ECO
| 
| 1.65
|-
| style="background-color:" |
| style="text-align:left;" | Laure Ferrari
| style="text-align:left;" | Miscellaneous Right
| DVD
| 
| 1.59
|-
| style="background-color:" |
| style="text-align:left;" | Pascal Ascheberg
| style="text-align:left;" | Other
| AUT
| 
| 0.74
|-
| style="background-color:" |
| style="text-align:left;" | Catherine Gsell
| style="text-align:left;" | Far Left
| EXG
| 
| 0.56
|-
| style="background-color:" |
| style="text-align:left;" | Catherine Bahl
| style="text-align:left;" | Other
| AUT
| 
| 0.01
|-
| colspan="6" style="background-color:#E9E9E9;"|
|- style="font-weight:bold"
| colspan="4" style="text-align:left;" | Total
| 
| 100%
|-
| colspan="6" style="background-color:#E9E9E9;"|
|-
| colspan="4" style="text-align:left;" | Registered voters
| 
| style="background-color:#E9E9E9;"|
|-
| colspan="4" style="text-align:left;" | Blank/Void ballots
| 
| 2.00%
|-
| colspan="4" style="text-align:left;" | Turnout
| 
| 54.11%
|-
| colspan="4" style="text-align:left;" | Abstentions
| 
| 45.89%
|-
| colspan="6" style="background-color:#E9E9E9;"|
|- style="font-weight:bold"
| colspan="4" style="text-align:left;" | Result
| colspan="2" style="background-color:" | UMP HOLD
|}

2007
Frédéric Reiss was elected with more than 50% of the vote in the first round of voting, and therefore no second round took place.

|- style="background-color:#E9E9E9;text-align:center;"
! colspan="2" rowspan="2" style="text-align:left;" | Candidate
! rowspan="2" colspan="2" style="text-align:left;" | Party
! colspan="2" | 1st round
|- style="background-color:#E9E9E9;text-align:center;"
! width="75" | Votes
! width="30" | %
|-
| style="background-color:" |
| style="text-align:left;" | Frédéric Reiss
| style="text-align:left;" | Union for a Popular Movement
| UMP
| 
| 65.91
|-
| style="background-color:" |
| style="text-align:left;" | Thomas Joerger
| style="text-align:left;" | UDF-Democratic Movement
| UDF-MoDem
| 
| 9.10
|-
| style="background-color:" |
| style="text-align:left;" | Ambroise Perrin
| style="text-align:left;" | Socialist Party
| PS
| 
| 8.71
|-
| style="background-color:" |
| style="text-align:left;" | Laurent Gnaedig
| style="text-align:left;" | National Front
| FN
| 
| 7.21
|-
| style="background-color:" |
| style="text-align:left;" | Songul Kiraz
| style="text-align:left;" | The Greens
| LV
| 
| 2.56
|-
| style="background-color:" |
| style="text-align:left;" | Héloïse Exbrayat
| style="text-align:left;" | Ecologist
| ECO
| 
| 1.36
|-
| style="background-color:" |
| style="text-align:left;" | Danièle Canton
| style="text-align:left;" | Far Left
| EXG
| 
| 1.22
|-
| style="background-color:" |
| style="text-align:left;" | Catherine Gsell
| style="text-align:left;" | Far Left
| EXG
| 
| 1.13
|-
| style="background-color:" |
| style="text-align:left;" | Gabriel Bastain
| style="text-align:left;" | Far Right
| EXD
| 
| 0.99
|-
| style="background-color:" |
| style="text-align:left;" | Christophe Bord
| style="text-align:left;" | Miscellaneous Right
| DVD
| 
| 0.91
|-
| style="background-color:" |
| style="text-align:left;" | Jean-Philippe Martin
| style="text-align:left;" | Independent
| DIV
| 
| 0.89
|-

| colspan="6" style="background-color:#E9E9E9;"|
|- style="font-weight:bold"
| colspan="4" style="text-align:left;" | Total
| 
| 100%
|-
| colspan="6" style="background-color:#E9E9E9;"|
|-
| colspan="4" style="text-align:left;" | Registered voters
| 
| style="background-color:#E9E9E9;"|
|-
| colspan="4" style="text-align:left;" | Blank/Void ballots
| 
| 2.53%
|-
| colspan="4" style="text-align:left;" | Turnout
| 
| 55.73%
|-
| colspan="4" style="text-align:left;" | Abstentions
| 
| 44.27%
|-
| colspan="6" style="background-color:#E9E9E9;"|
|- style="font-weight:bold"
| colspan="4" style="text-align:left;" | Result
| colspan="2" style="background-color:" | UMP HOLD
|}

2002
The UMP candidate was elected with more than 50% of the vote in the first round of voting, and therefore no second round took place.

|- style="background-color:#E9E9E9;text-align:center;"
! colspan="2" rowspan="2" style="text-align:left;" | Candidate
! rowspan="2" colspan="2" style="text-align:left;" | Party
! colspan="2" | 1st round
|- style="background-color:#E9E9E9;text-align:center;"
! width="75" | Votes
! width="30" | %
|-
| style="background-color:" |
| style="text-align:left;" | Francois Loos
| style="text-align:left;" | Union for a Presidential Majority
| UMP
| 
| 60.42
|-
| style="background-color:" |
| style="text-align:left;" | J. Marie Freund
| style="text-align:left;" | National Front
| FN
| 
| 15.62
|-
| style="background-color:" |
| style="text-align:left;" | Pierre Mammosser
| style="text-align:left;" | Socialist Party
| PS
| 
| 13.01
|-
| style="background-color:" |
| style="text-align:left;" | Stephane Reiss
| style="text-align:left;" | The Greens
| LV
| 
| 3.76
|-
| style="background-color:" |
| style="text-align:left;" | Catherine Gsell
| style="text-align:left;" | Workers’ Struggle
| LO
| 
| 1.51
|-
| style="background-color:" |
| style="text-align:left;" | Bruno Wolff
| style="text-align:left;" | Regionalist
| REG
| 
| 1.46
|-
| style="background-color:" |
| style="text-align:left;" | H. Pierre Bapst
| style="text-align:left;" | Ecologist
| ECO
| 
| 1.25
|-
| style="background-color:" |
| style="text-align:left;" | Colette Marchal
| style="text-align:left;" | Ecologist
| ECO
| 
| 1.00
|-
| style="background-color:" |
| style="text-align:left;" | Catherine Wagner
| style="text-align:left;" | Independent
| DIV
| 
| 0.81
|-
| style="background-color:" |
| style="text-align:left;" | Frederic Lemaire
| style="text-align:left;" | Movement for France
| MPF
| 
| 0.74
|-
| style="background-color:" |
| style="text-align:left;" | Ralph Blindauer
| style="text-align:left;" | Communist Party
| PCF
| 
| 0.42
|-
| colspan="6" style="background-color:#E9E9E9;"|
|- style="font-weight:bold"
| colspan="4" style="text-align:left;" | Total
| 
| 100%
|-
| colspan="6" style="background-color:#E9E9E9;"|
|-
| colspan="4" style="text-align:left;" | Registered voters
| 
| style="background-color:#E9E9E9;"|
|-
| colspan="4" style="text-align:left;" | Blank/Void ballots
| 
| 2.97%
|-
| colspan="4" style="text-align:left;" | Turnout
| 
| 58.17%
|-
| colspan="4" style="text-align:left;" | Abstentions
| 
| 41.83%
|-
| colspan="6" style="background-color:#E9E9E9;"|
|- style="font-weight:bold"
| colspan="4" style="text-align:left;" | Result
| colspan="2" style="background-color:" | UMP GAIN FROM UDF
|}

Sources

8